John Peel (1939–2004) was a British broadcaster and radio personality.

John Peel may also refer to:
 John Peel (huntsman) (1776–1854), huntsman and the subject of the 19th century song "D'ye ken John Peel"
 "John Peel," short-name for the 19th century song "D'ye ken John Peel?"
 John Peel (priest) (1798–1875), Dean of Worcester
John Peel (Tamworth MP) (1804–1872), MP for Tamworth 1863–68, 1871–73
 Sir John Peel (gynaecologist) (1904–2005), Surgeon-Gynaecologist to Queen Elizabeth II, 1961–1973
 Sir John Peel (Leicester MP) (1912–2004), British politician, MP for Leicester South East 1957–74
 J. H. B. Peel (1913–1983), British writer about farming and the countryside
 John Peel (writer) (born 1954), science fiction author

See also
 Jonathan Peel (1799–1879), British soldier, politician, and racehorse owner